Michail Alekseyevich Semenov (born 6 February 1986) is a cross-country skier from Belarus. He competed for Belarus at the 2014 Winter Olympics in the cross-country skiing events.

References

External links
 
 
 

1986 births
Living people
People from Ostrov, Pskov Oblast
Olympic cross-country skiers of Belarus
Cross-country skiers at the 2014 Winter Olympics
Cross-country skiers at the 2018 Winter Olympics
Belarusian male cross-country skiers
Tour de Ski skiers
Universiade medalists in cross-country skiing
Universiade silver medalists for Belarus
Competitors at the 2013 Winter Universiade